The 2017–18 Alabama Crimson Tide men's basketball team (variously "Alabama", "UA", "Bama" or "The Tide") represented the University of Alabama in the 2017–18 NCAA Division I men's basketball season. The team was led by third-year head coach Avery Johnson and played its home games at Coleman Coliseum in Tuscaloosa, Alabama as a member of the Southeastern Conference. They finished the season 20–16, 8–10 in SEC play to finish in a tie for ninth place. They defeated Texas A&M and Auburn in the SEC tournament before losing in the semifinals to Kentucky. They received an at-large bid to the NCAA tournament where they defeated Virginia Tech in the First Round before losing in the Second Round to Villanova.

Previous season
The Crimson Tide finished the 2016–17 season 19–15 overall and 8–10 in SEC play to finish in a tie for fifth place. They defeated Mississippi State and South Carolina to advance to the semifinals of the SEC tournament where they lost to Kentucky. They received an invitation to the National Invitation Tournament where they lost in the first round to Richmond.

Off-season

Departures

2017 recruiting class

Future recruits

2018–19 team recruits

Roster

Schedule and results
On November 25, 2017, Alabama participated in one of the strangest moments of NCAA basketball history. During their game against #14 ranked Minnesota Golden Gophers, Alabama's bench players left the bench area during a scuffle with Minnesota's players midway through the second half, which resulted in Alabama's entire bench being ejected. Not long after the ejections, Dazon Ingram fouled out with 11:37 left in the game, which resulted in Alabama playing the rest of the game in a 4 vs. 5 manner. Not long afterwards, John Petty turned his ankle and could not return for the rest of the game, thus leaving Alabama with only three players with 10:41 left in the contest. From that point on Alabama was forced to play with only senior shooting guard/small forward Riley Norris, freshman power forward Galin Smith, and star freshman point guard Collin Sexton in a 3-on-5 setting throughout the rest of the game. While Minnesota was up by as many as 15 points during the undermanned portion of the game, Alabama would fight to cut the deficit to as few as 3 points due to Collin Sexton's leadership, which included a 40 point game from him. However, the Golden Gophers would ultimately hold on to win 89–84 over the shorthanded Crimson Tide. Despite losing, Alabama would improve their rank to #24 due to their performance while undermanned and nearly upsetting Minnesota that night. The game would be described as one of the strangest in college basketball history.

|-
!colspan=12 style=|Canadian Foreign Tour

|-
!colspan=12 style=|Exhibition

|-
!colspan=12 style=|Regular season

|-
!colspan=12 style=|  SEC Tournament

|-
!colspan=12 style=|  NCAA Tournament

Rankings

*AP does not release post-NCAA Tournament rankings^Coaches did not release a Week 2 poll.

See also
 2017–18 Alabama Crimson Tide women's basketball team

References

Alabama
Alabama Crimson Tide men's basketball seasons
Alabama
Alabama Crimson Tide
Alabama Crimson Tide